AS Oslo Sporveier or the Oslo Public Transport Administration is a municipally owned limited company that is responsible for planning, marketing and organising the public transport in Oslo, Norway. The company does not operate any public transport, but instead either awards public service obligation (PSO) contracts or negotiates contracts with Oslo T-banedrift and Oslo Sporvognsdrift concerning the operation of Oslo T-bane and the Oslo Tramway.

Both companies are owned directly by the City of Oslo. Oslo Sporveier has about 50 employees and administrates both transport within the sections of bus, metro, tram and ferry. The company cooperates with Stor-Oslo Lokaltrafikk (in Akershus) and the Norwegian State Railways for coordinating transfer tickets between the systems. The three companies have also created the electronic ticket Flexus.

Contracts for buses are awarded to Sporveisbussene, Nexus Trafikk and Norgesbuss. The ferries are operated by Oslo Fergene and Bygdøfergene. All Oslo buses are painted red. Note that all buses and ferries that operate from Oslo and out of the county are not administrated by Oslo Sporveier.

From  the company was replaced by Ruter.

References 

Public transport administrators of Norway
Public transport in Oslo
Norwegian brands
Oslo Sporveier
Bus transport in Oslo
Ferry transport in Oslo

fr:AS Oslo Sporveier
no:Oslo Sporveier
nn:AS Oslo Sporveier